Eitarō, Eitaro, Eitarou or Eitaroh (written: 英太郎, 栄太郎, 榮太郎 or 鋭太郎) is a masculine Japanese given name. Notable people with the name include:

, Japanese golfer
, Japanese sumo wrestler
, Japanese-born American artist
, Japanese businessman and politician
, Japanese politician
, Japanese footballer
, Japanese economic historian
, Japanese sprinter
, Japanese actor
, Japanese actor
, Japanese sport wrestler
, Japanese general

Japanese masculine given names